The Association of Member Episcopal Conferences in Eastern Africa (AMECEA) is the association of episcopal conferences of Eastern Africa and the coordinating body of the Catholic dioceses. The AMECEA was established in 1961, with Cardinal Archbishop of Lusaka Adam Kozlowiecki, SJ, its founding president. It is one of ten members of the Symposium of Episcopal Conferences of Africa and Madagascar(SECAM).

Members of the AMECEA include the episcopal conferences of Ethiopia (1979), Eritrea (1993), Kenya (1961), Malawi (1961), Tanzania (1961), Zambia (1961), Sudan (1979), Uganda (1961). Somalia (1995) and Djibouti (2002) have observer status.

The current chairman is Most Rev Charles Joseph Sampa Kasonde (since July 21, 2018).

Honorary members
Cardinal Polycarp Pengo, Tanzania
Cardinal Emmanuel Wamala, Uganda
Cardinal Gabriel Zubeir Wako, Sudan
Cardinal John Njue, Kenya

Members
Archbishop Thomas Luke Msusa, Malawi
Bishop Rev. Kidane Yebio, Eritrea
Bishop Tesfaselassie Medhin, Ethiopia
Bishop Philip Sulumeti, Kenya
Bishop Isaac Amani, Tanzania
Bishop Daniel Adwok, Sudan
Bishop Joseph M. Zuza, Malawi
Bishop Emmanuel Obbo, Uganda
Priest Pio Rutechura, Secretary General

Chairmen
 Adam Kozłowiecki, Archbishop of Roman Catholic Archdiocese of Lusaka (1961-1964)
 Vincent J. McCauley, C.S.C., Bishop of Roman Catholic Diocese of Fort Portal (1964-1973)
 James Odongo, Archbishop of the Roman Catholic Archdiocese of Tororo (1973-1979)
 Medardo Joseph Mazombwe, Bishop of the Roman Catholic Diocese of Chipata (1979-1985)
 Dennis Harold De Jong, Bishop of the Roman Catholic Diocese of Ndola (1986-1989)
 Nicodemus Kirima, Archbishop of the Roman Catholic Archdiocese of Nyeri (1989-1995)
 Jehoshaphat Lebulu Louis, Archbishop of the Roman Catholic Archdiocese of Arusha (1995-2002)
 Paul Bakyenga, Archbishop of the Roman Catholic Archdiocese of Mbarara (2002-2008)
 Tarcisius Gervazio Ziyaye, Archbishop of the Roman Catholic Archdiocese of Lilongwe (2008 - 2014)
 Berhaneyesus Demerew Souraphiel, C.M. Archbishop of Addis Ababa (Ethiopia) (2014 - 2018)
 Charles Joseph Sampa Kasonde, Bishop of Solwezi (since 2018)

See also
Catholic Church in Africa

References

External links
 http://www.amecea.org/
 http://www.missio.com/bwo/dcms/sites/bistum/extern/weltkirche/archiv/ausgabe2_2006.html?f_action=show&f_newsitem_

1961 in Christianity
Africa East
Catholic Church in Africa